Ngatuaine Mani (born 5 March 1982) in the Cook Islands is a footballer who plays as a defender. He currently plays for Avatiu in the Cook Islands Round Cup and the Cook Islands national football team.

References

1982 births
Living people
Cook Islands international footballers
Association football defenders
Cook Island footballers
2000 OFC Nations Cup players